Herbert S. Snyder (born September 7, 1953 in Winchester, Virginia) is a former Democratic member of the West Virginia Senate representing District 16.

Snyder served as a Jefferson County Commissioner from 1990 to 1996, when he was elected to his first term in the State Senate. He was reelected in 2000, defeating future Jefferson County Commissioner Greg Corliss. In 2004, he was defeated in the primary by former Ranson, West Virginia, Mayor Greg Lance, who went on to lose the November election to Republican John Yoder.

When Yoder announced he would run for State Circuit Court Judge in 2008, Snyder announced his bid for a third term. He defeated businessman Bob Adams, a Republican, in the November 2008 election.

After being elected to a fourth term in 2012, Snyder expressed interest in running for West Virginia's 2nd congressional district in 2014.

Snyder is a chemist and operates Hydrochem Labs. He lives in Shenandoah Junction, West Virginia, with his wife Stephanie. The couple has six children, one of whom, Rod Snyder, is a former president of the Young Democrats of America.

In the 2016 election, Snyder did not run for re-election to the state Senate, instead running unsuccessfully for the office of Jefferson County Clerk.

References

External links

West Virginia Legislature  official websiteyou must select District 16 to see Herb Snyder
Elect Snyder Committee  Reelection website
 

1953 births
21st-century American chemists
Living people
People from Jefferson County, West Virginia
Politicians from Winchester, Virginia
County commissioners in West Virginia
Democratic Party West Virginia state senators
21st-century American politicians
Scientists from Virginia